Overseas ( is one of the 29 constituencies represented in the Chamber of Deputies, the lower house of the Italian parliament. With more than 5.8 million registered voters is the largest constituency by population, but it currently elects only 8 deputies.

The constituency was established by the constitutional law n. 1 on 2000.

Members of the Parliament

Legislature XIX (2022–present)

See also
 Overseas constituencies of the Italian Parliament
 Overseas (Senate of the Republic constituency)

References

Chamber of Deputies constituencies in Italy
2000 establishments in Italy
Constituencies established in 2000
Politics of Italy